Pepsi Beats of the Beautiful Game is a compilation album that features various artists. The album was released on June 9, 2014, ahead of 2014 FIFA World Cup that kicked off June 12 in Brazil.

Background
Pepsi Max premiered the songs from the album as singles on the iTunes store, with accompanying film tracks free to watch on their website, YouTube and VEVO.

Track listing

Music videos

Release history

References

2014 compilation albums
PepsiCo